Oleksandr Polunytskiy is a retired Soviet and Ukrainian football player.

Career
Pupil of the Children's and Youth Sports School named after Gorpinko (Poltava). The first coach was Karmalik V. N.. At the age of 15, he got into the academic class of Pavel Yakovenko, passed all his steps: Dynamo (Obukhov), Borysfen-2 Boryspil, Dynamo-3 Kyiv, youth teams of Ukraine. In the spring of 2004 he returned to his hometown to Vorskla Poltava. He made his debut in the vysheligovoy team on May 22, 2004 in the game against Chornomorets Odessa (0: 2). In total, he played 5 matches in the Ukrainian Premier League. Since 2006, he played in the Ukrainian First League, playing in the teams Desna Chernihiv, Stal Alchevsk, Stal Kamianske, Mykolaiv, Poltava, Poltava-2 Karlivka. In September 2013 he became a player of Cherkasy Slavutich.

National team
In 2002, as part of the youth national team of Ukraine under (17 years old) took part in the matches of the European Championship. In 2004 he was called up to the youth team (under 19 years old) to prepare for the European Championship. It was not included in the official application for the championship. He played 18 matches for the youth national team of Ukraine, scored 1 goal. For the junior national team of Ukraine played 19 matches.

References

External links 
 Oleksandr Polunytskiy footballfacts.ru
 Oleksandr Polunytskiy allplayers.in.ua

1985 births
Living people
Soviet footballers
FC Desna Chernihiv players
FC Vorskla Poltava players
FC Stal Alchevsk players
FC Cherkashchyna players
FC Poltava players
FC Karlivka players
FC Mykolaiv players
FC Dynamo-3 Kyiv players
FC Borysfen-2 Boryspil players
Ukrainian footballers
Ukrainian Second League players
Association football defenders